MovieZine is a Swedish film and entertainment website that focuses on news and reviews. It was founded in 2003 and is Sweden's most popular film and television series website.

References

External links
 

Swedish film websites
2003 establishments in Sweden